Endfest was an annual summer music festival hosted by KNDD, also known as 107.7 The End, an alternative rock radio station based in Seattle, Washington. It featured such bands as Mudhoney, Beastie Boys, Interpol, Red Hot Chili Peppers, Wolfmother, Eagles of Death Metal, The Mars Volta, and others.

Notes
No Endfest has taken place since 2009.
Endfest 17- was cancelled due to poor ticket sales. It was replaced by Endfest '08 Unplugged at Sky Church in Experience Music Project, Seattle Center
Endfest 12- Cold who were on the original bill cancelled their appearance and were replaced by Smile Empty Soul
Endfest 11- Our Lady Peace canceled at the last minute, but later offered a free ticket to their Seattle show a few months later to Endfest ticket holders.
Endfest 2- The Gin Blossoms were scheduled to play but at the last minute were replaced by School of Fish.

Line-ups

References
1077TheEnd.com
KNDD-FM Public File

External links
 107TheEnd.com - Official Website

Rock festivals in the United States
Festivals in Seattle
Festivals in Washington (state)